Piera Hudson (born 7 February 1996) is a New Zealand alpine ski racer. Piera Hudson went to the first ever youth olympics in Innsbruck Austria in 2012.

She competed at the 2015 World Championships in Beaver Creek, USA, in the slalom.

Hudson has is a five-times winner of the New Zealand Giant Slalom National Championship title (2011,2014, 2015, 2016, 2018) including at the age of 15 in her first year of FIS. She is also a three-times winner (2014, 2015 and 2018) of the New Zealand Slalom National Championship title held annually at Coronet Peak. Hudson has also twice won the New Zealand Super G National Championship title (2013, 2016) held at Mt Hutt.

Hudson has won the Australia New Zealand Cup (ANC) Giant Slalom Yellow Bib twice (2015 and 2016),  Slalom Yellow Bib three times (2016, 2018, 2019) and the Super G Yellow Bib once in 2017. She has won the overall ANC Yellow Bib three times (2016, 2018, 2019). The yellow bib is awarded to the top performing Australian and New Zealand female competitors from the ANC series races held in Australia and New Zealand. The yellow bib securesanathlete a spot on the World Cup circuit as well a  top 31 start position on the Europa Cup and NorAm circuit for the northern hemisphere season.

In November 2018 Hudson finished 26th in the World Cup slalom at Killington, Vermont, USA. As a result Hudson was the first New Zealand Alpine skier to score World Cup Points since Claudia Riegler in 2003.

In December 2018 Hudson competed in eight Far East Cup races held at two different venues in China. Hudson won a Giant Slalom, and placed third in a Slalom at Wanlong Resort. She then won three consecutive races (one in Slalom, two in Giant Slalom) at Taiwoo Resort the following week. The three Giant Slalom victories are career best FIS Point results. Hudson finished 8th overall and 6th in Giant Slalom for the 2019 season in the Far East Cup.

World Cup results

Season standings

References

External links
 
 

1996 births
Living people
New Zealand female alpine skiers
Alpine skiers at the 2012 Winter Youth Olympics
21st-century New Zealand women